Vancourt may refer to:

Randy Vancourt, Canadian composer and musician
Vancourt, Texas, unincorporated community in the United States